Menard County is the name of two counties in the United States:

 Menard County, Illinois 
 Menard County, Texas